Meijer Joseph "Mike" Keyzer (15 October 1911 – 16 July 1983) was a Dutch politician and diplomat of the People's Party for Freedom and Democracy (VVD).

Decorations

References

External links

Official
  M.J. (Mike) Keyzer Parlement & Politiek

 

 

 

1911 births
1983 deaths
Dutch corporate directors
Dutch nonprofit executives
Dutch nonprofit directors
Dutch Jews
Dutch people of World War II
Dutch prisoners of war in World War II
Dutch public broadcasting administrators
Erasmus University Rotterdam alumni
Jewish Dutch politicians
Knights of the Order of the Netherlands Lion
Members of the House of Representatives (Netherlands)
Officers of the Order of Orange-Nassau
People from Venlo
People's Party for Freedom and Democracy politicians
Theresienstadt Ghetto survivors
State Secretaries for Transport of the Netherlands
World War II prisoners of war held by Germany
World War II civilian prisoners
20th-century Dutch civil servants
20th-century Dutch diplomats
20th-century Dutch economists
20th-century Dutch politicians